The Junior League World Series Southeast and Southwest regions—formerly the South Region, until 2002—are two of the six United States regions that currently send teams to the World Series in Taylor, Michigan. Together, the regions' participation in the JLWS dates back to 1981.

South Region States
In 2002 the region was split in half, into Southeast and Southwest regions.

Southeast

 Georgia

Southwest

 (East)
 (West)

Region Champions

South Region Champions

Results by State

As of the 2022 Junior League World Series.

Southeast Region Champions

Southwest Region Champions

Results by State
As of the 2022 Junior League World Series.

See also
South Region in other Little League divisions
Little League – South 1957-2000
Little League – Southeast
Little League – Southwest
Intermediate League
Senior League
Big League

References

South
Defunct baseball competitions in the United States